Jose Casiano Portilla (born September 11, 1972) is a Mexican-American former American football offensive tackle who played two seasons with the Atlanta Falcons of the National Football League. He first enrolled at Ricks College before transferring to the University of Arizona. He attended MacArthur High School in East Aldine, Texas. Portilla was also a member of the Los Angeles Xtreme of the XFL.

Early years
Portilla was born on September 11, 1972 in Zaragoza, Mexico and moved to the Houston, Texas area when he was six years old. He played high school football for the MacArthur High School Generals and was an all-district selection.

College career

Ricks College
Portilla first played college football for the Ricks Vikings. The team only lost one game in his two years there. He then served in a Mormon missionary trip from 1994 to 1995.

University of Arizona
Portilla transferred to play for the Arizona Wildcats from 1996 to 1997. He was a two-year starter for the Wildcats, earning 1st Team Pac-10 All-Academic his senior year in 1997. He was also named to the Hula Bowl.

Professional career

Atlanta Falcons
Portilla signed with the Atlanta Falcons in 1998 after going undrafted in the 1998 NFL Draft. He played in all sixteen regular season games and three post season games, including the NFC Championship Game and Super Bowl XXXIII, during his rookie season. He played in four games for the Falcons in 1999. Portilla was released by the Falcons before the start of the 2000 season.

Los Angeles Xtreme
Portilla played for the Los Angeles Xtreme in 2001, winning the Million Dollar Game.

References

External links
Just Sports Stats

Living people
1972 births
Players of American football from Texas
American football offensive tackles
Mexican players of American football
Ricks Vikings football players
Arizona Wildcats football players
Atlanta Falcons players
Los Angeles Xtreme players
Mexican expatriates in the United States
Sportspeople from Coahuila
Sportspeople from Harris County, Texas
MacArthur High School (Harris County, Texas) alumni